Sports Sunday is an Australian sports television program currently broadcast on the Nine Network at 10.00am Sunday mornings. The show is hosted by journalist Roz Kelly, with a roster of rotating panelists including former Australian cricket captain Mark Taylor, Australian netball player Liz Ellis and journalist Sean Maloney.

The weekly show features discussions and debates on the previous week's sporting news and events, along with guest interviews and other sporting highlights from both Australia and internationally.

History 
The show aired its debut episode on 5 March 2017, and was a replacement for the long running Wide World of Sports program after host Ken Sutcliffe's retirement in 2016. The debut season was hosted by television presenter Emma Freedman.

It was announced on 8 February 2018 that host Emma Freedman had left the Nine Network to take up a position at the NRL-based channel Fox League. James Bracey replaced Freedman as host from 2018.

Journalist Roz Kelly took over the hosting role from Bracey in May 2022, following his appointment to sports presenter of Sydney's nightly Nine News bulletin.

Nick McArdle is the primary fill in host whenever Roz Kelly is unavailable.

Current regular panelists
 Mark Bosnich
 Casey Dellacqua
 Liz Ellis
 Craig Foster
 Richard Freedman
 Sam Groth
 Sean Maloney
 Mark Taylor
 Todd Woodbridge

Former hosts and panelists
 Emma Freedman (host, 2017)
 Peter FitzSimons (regular panelist, 2017-2021)
 Neil Breen (regular panelist, 2017-2020)
 Shane Crawford (regular panelist, 2017-2021)
 Michael Slater (regular panelist, 2017-2018)
 James Bracey (host, 2018-2022)

See also

 List of Australian television series
 List of programs broadcast by Nine Network

References

External links

Nine's Wide World of Sport
2017 Australian television series debuts
English-language television shows
Australian sports television series